Morohoshi, or Moroboshi is a Japanese surname. Notable people with the surname include:

, Japanese manga artist
, Japanese journalist
, Japanese voice actress

Japanese-language surnames